Transport in Edmonton is fairly typical for a Canadian city of its size, involving air, rail, road and public transit.
This has resulted in a heavily private transportation-oriented transportation network typical of any other city of its size in North America. However, Edmonton does not have the extensive limited access freeway system typical of what one would find in a US metro area, and the road network is somewhat unusual in regard to access to downtown.

Public transportation

The Edmonton Transit System (ETS) is the primary public transportation agency, covering most parts of the city, but only within the City of Edmonton proper (with one exception). Neighbouring communities outside Edmonton's city limits  such as Sherwood Park and St. Albert operate their own public transit agencies and offer public transportation to and from neighbouring communities.  The smaller city of Fort Saskatchewan contracts out bus services there to ETS.

Light rail

In 1978, Edmonton became the first city with a population of under one million to operate a light rail transit (LRT) system in North America. The LRT currently runs on two lines the Capital Line and the Metro Line extending 24.3 km. The system runs from Clareview Station in northeast Edmonton, across the North Saskatchewan River, to Century Park in the south; and northwest from downtown to NAIT. Of the 18 stations on the network, six are underground, running through the downtown core and the University of Alberta main campus, with the rest at ground level. , the city was constructing the Valley Line to the southeast and western parts of the city. A two-stop Capital Line extension to the Heritage Valley Transit Centre was under construction as well.

Buses

The ETS operates a fleet of well over 960 buses across the city with 180 regular routes. Edmonton was one of two cities in Canada (the other is Vancouver) that operated a trolley bus system until service was discontinued in May 2009. The ETS also operates a specialized system for disabled people called DATS (Disabled Adult Transit System).

Commuter service to Edmonton's suburbs is provided by Strathcona County Transit and St. Albert Transit.

Roads and streets

Highways

Edmonton is connected to British Columbia and Saskatchewan via the Yellowhead Highway (Highway 16, or Yellowhead Trail within city limits), and to Calgary and Red Deer via the Queen Elizabeth II Highway (known as Calgary Trail (southbound) or Gateway Boulevard (northbound) within city limits, on the alignment of the former Calgary and Edmonton Trail).

Anthony Henday Drive

Anthony Henday Drive (Highway 216) is a  ring road encircling the City of Edmonton completed on October 1, 2016. The southeast leg from Calgary Trail/Gateway Boulevard to Highway 14 opened on October 23, 2007. The northwest leg of Anthony Henday Drive from Yellowhead Trail in the west to Manning Drive in the northeast opened on November 1, 2011. The remaining  leg in the northeast, from Manning Drive to the Yellowhead Highway in east Edmonton, began construction in 2012, and was completed on October 1, 2016.

Street layout

Edmonton's roads were originally all named (as opposed to numbered) and arranged so that roads titled "avenues" ran north–south and "streets" ran east–west. The first move to a grid-style system began as the city expanded west - the streets west of Queens Avenue were switched to run on a north–south orientation with 1st Street (now 101 Street) being west of Queens Avenue, and the street numbers increasing further west (i.e. 10 Street was one block west of 9 Street). West of Queens Avenue, the avenues also switched (running in an east–west direction); although, unlike the streets, the avenues were never numbered. This led to a confusing situation with avenues becoming streets despite no change in direction. For example, MacKenzie Avenue (now 104 Ave) became Boyle Street west of Queens Avenue, and Athabasca Avenue (now 102 Ave) became Elizabeth Street west of Queens Avenue.

The city of Strathcona had adopted a grid and quadrant system before its amalgamation with Edmonton, with the city being centred on Main Street (now 104 Street) and Whyte Avenue (also named 82 Avenue). This street system was similar to that of present-day Calgary's system, having NW, NE, SW and SE quadrants. Strathcona's grid/quadrant system was abandoned in 1914.

In 1914, following amalgamation with Strathcona, Edmonton adopted a new street numbering system, which with a few small modifications is still in use. The centre of the city, Jasper Avenue and 101 Street, was set as the starting point. Jasper Avenue was one of the few streets that was not assigned a number. The other avenues were numbered as if Jasper Avenue (between 124 Street and 97 Street) had been 101 Avenue. Several other streets have maintained their names despite of having been reassigned as numbers — these include but are not limited to Whyte (82) Avenue, Norwood Boulevard (111 Avenue), and Alberta (118) Avenue, while others were given new names over time, such as Rue Hull (99) Street - which is a segment of what used to be Queens Avenue.

Avenues run east and west; streets run north and south. Avenue numbers increase to the north; street numbers increase to the west. When a street lies between two numbered streets, letters are appended as suffixes. For example, 107A Avenue lies between 107 Avenue and 108 Avenue. Occasionally the letter B will be used and more rarely C, to denote multiple streets between 2 different street numbers. For example, 17A, 17B and 17C Avenues all lie between 17 Avenue and 18 Avenue.

Houses with odd numbers are on the east side of a street or the south side of an avenue. Dropping the last two digits of a house number tells what two streets or avenues the house lies between, for example 8023 135A Avenue is between 80 Street and 81 Street, and 13602 100 Street is between 136 Avenue and 137 Avenue.

As the city grew in the 1980s, it began to run out of street numbers in the east, and avenue numbers in the south. Therefore, in 1982 a quadrant system was adopted. Quadrant Avenue (1 Avenue; only constructed west of the river) and Meridian Street (0 Street) divide the city into four quadrants: northwest (NW), southwest (SW), northeast (NE) and southeast (SE). The vast majority of the city falls within the northwest quadrant, 105 Avenue SW (Highway 19) being the south boundary, 33 Street NE being the farthest east the city extends, while in the other direction the city extends west of 200 Street NW and north of 200 Avenue NW.

All Edmonton streets now officially have their quadrant included at the end of their names, but it is usual — even on official signage — to omit the "NW" especially when there is no possibility of confusion with a street in another quadrant. The city's emergency services, however, have begun to encourage residents to get into the habit of using quadrants in all addresses.

Airports

Edmonton is served by one major and several smaller general aviation airports. The largest airport, Edmonton International Airport is located south of the city limits, near the city of Leduc. It is the fifth busiest airport in Canada, with 8 million passengers using the facilities in 2015. Edmonton has scheduled daily non-stop service to all major Canadian cities and several major US hubs including Denver, Las Vegas, Minneapolis, Phoenix and Seattle. Seasonal destinations include various Mexican and Caribbean resorts as well as Hawaii.

Edmonton Airports controls Edmonton International, and Villeneuve Airport, which primarily provides general aviation and flight training services.

Edmonton is located geographically closer to many destinations in Europe and Asia than the airports in Calgary, Vancouver, Winnipeg as well as points in Western United States. Edmonton International Airport is the future home of an inland port logistics support facility in support of the Port Alberta initiative. The port is designed to provide a comprehensive shipping hub connection rail, air, and naval cargo shipments through the Port of Prince Rupert.

Inter-city rail

Edmonton railway station is served by Via Rail trains on their transcontinental service The Canadian. Westbound trains of The Canadian continue toward Jasper, Alberta, while eastbound trains run toward Saskatoon, Saskatchewan. The station is about 6 km from the centre of the city. Formerly, the Via trains arrived at the CN Tower downtown, in the Old Canadian National rail yard, but the downtown trackage has been abandoned to the LRT and new urban development. The High Level Bridge, formerly CPR's route into the downtown, is used in the summer for historical streetcars.

Bicycle and pedestrian

Edmonton has an extensive multi-use trail system totaling over 150 kilometres in length, 130 of which lie within the North Saskatchewan River valley parks system. The unpaved trail network is even more extensive — 420 kilometres in total. The city also has 105 km of signed street bike paths across the city with protected crossings.

Edmonton has an indoor pedway system connecting the Edmonton City Centre mall, the Stanley A. Milner Library, the LRT system and other commercial office buildings in its downtown core. The pedway system runs above ground, at-grade as well as underground.

Funicular
A funicular beside Hotel Macdonald connects Downtown Edmonton with the river valley.

See also

Notes

External links

Edmonton Transit System